Cheryl J. Franklin (born 11 September 1955), is a science fiction and fantasy writer.

Biography
Cheryl Jean Franklin was born in Pasadena, California on 11 September 1955. Franklin graduated from the University of Redlands with a degree in Mathematics. After graduation she got a position as a systems analyst with Rockwell. Franklin worked as a communications systems analyst for Boeing in Anaheim in California from 1976 to 2001. Franklin suffered from vision issues and this was what initially prompted her to write. She created her first novels with DAW books and she has been a contributor for Locus Magazine. Her work was included in the DAW 30th Anniversary anthology. She is a member of Science Fiction Writers of America. Her work received good reviews and was well received.

Bibliography

Taormin series
 Fire Get (1987)
 Fire Lord (1989)
 Tales of Taormin (omnibus, 2005)

Network/Consortium series
 The Light in Exile (1990)
 Fire Crossing (1991)
 The Inquisitor (1992)
 Ghost Shadow (1996)

Other novels
 Sable, Shadow, and Ice (1994)

Short fiction
 "Words" (2002)

References and sources

1955 births
American women novelists
20th-century American novelists
American women short story writers
20th-century American short story writers
American science fiction writers
Women science fiction and fantasy writers
Writers from Pasadena, California
Novelists from California
Living people
20th-century American women writers
21st-century American women